Ogawa Station is the name of three train stations in Japan:

 Ogawa Station (Kumamoto) (小川駅)
 Ogawa Station (Tokyo) (小川駅)
 Ogawa Station (Aichi) (緒川駅)